Esling may refer to:

 Catharine H. Esling (1812–1897), American writer
 Frederick Esling (1860-1955), Australian railway engineer and chess master
 John Esling (born 1949), Canadian linguist
 William Esling (1868–1946), Conservative and National Government party member of the House of Commons of Canada